The 2016 United States Senate election in South Dakota was held November 8, 2016, to elect a member of the United States Senate to represent the State of South Dakota, concurrently with the 2016 U.S. presidential election, as well as other elections to the United States Senate in other states and elections to the United States House of Representatives and various state and local elections. The primaries were held June 7.

Incumbent Republican Senator John Thune was considered a potential 2016 presidential candidate, but decided instead to run for a third term in office.

Republican primary

Candidates

Declared 
 John Thune, incumbent U.S. Senator

Declined 
 Gordon Howie, former State Senator, candidate for Governor in 2010 and Independent candidate for the U.S. Senate in 2014
 Stace Nelson, former State Representative and candidate for the U.S. Senate in 2014

Democratic primary

Candidates

Declared 
 Jay Williams, Chair of the Yankton County Democratic Party, former Yankton School Board member and candidate for the State House in 2010 and 2014

Declined 
 Tom Daschle, former U.S. Senator
 Cory Heidelberger, teacher and political activist (running for State Senate)
 Stephanie Herseth Sandlin, former U.S. Representative
 Mike Huether, Mayor of Sioux Falls
 Bernie Hunhoff, state senator and candidate for governor in 1998
 Sam Hurst, filmmaker and television news producer
 Brendan Johnson, former United States Attorney for the District of South Dakota
 Frank Kloucek, former State Senator
 Phil Schreck, KSFY-TV senior meteorologist
 Billie Sutton, Minority Leader of the South Dakota Senate
 Rick Weiland, businessman, nominee for SD-AL in 1996 and candidate in 2002 and nominee for U.S. Senate in 2014

Constitution Party 
The Constitution Party nominated Kurt Evans for Senate depending on the resolution of a ballot-access legal action, however, the party's request to place a candidate on the ballot was not granted.

General election

Debates 
 Complete video of debate, October 13, 2016
 Complete video of debate, October 23, 2016

Polling

Predictions

Results

References

External links 
Official campaign websites
 John Thune (R) for Senate
 Jay Williams (D) for Senate

Senate
South Dakota
2016